Pamunkey Creek is a  river in Orange and Spotsylvania counties in the U.S. state of Virginia.  It is a tributary of the North Anna River.

The creek is formed by the confluence of smaller branches that rise in the town of Orange, Virginia, then flows southeast across the Virginia Piedmont.  It joins the North Anna as an arm of Lake Anna, a reservoir.  Via the North Anna, Pamunkey, and York rivers, Pamunkey Creek is part of the Chesapeake Bay watershed.

See also
List of rivers of Virginia

References

USGS Hydrologic Unit Map - State of Virginia (1974)

Rivers of Virginia
Tributaries of the York River (Virginia)
Rivers of Orange County, Virginia
Rivers of Spotsylvania County, Virginia